This article lists hydroelectric power stations that generate power using the conventional dammed method.

After passing on 7 December 2007 the  mark of the Itaipu Dam, the facility was ranked as the largest power-generating facility ever built. Construction of this dam commenced in 1994, and was completed in 2012, nearly two decades after it started.

Hydroelectric power stations
The following two lists rank the 199 largest conventional hydroelectric power stations that have an installed electric power generation capacity of at least 1,000 MW and also 15 plants under construction with planned capacity of at least 1,000 MW.

In service

Under construction

See also

List of largest hydroelectric power stations
List of largest dams
List of largest power stations in the world
List of pumped-storage hydroelectric power stations
List of run-of-the-river hydroelectric power stations
List of tallest dams in the world
List of hydroelectric power station failures

Notes

References

Hydroelectric
Conventional
Power station